Squalius carolitertii is a species of fresh-water fish in the family Cyprinidae. It is found in Portugal and Spain, and known there as the bordallo, escalo or gallego.

Its natural habitats are rivers and intermittent rivers. It is not considered threatened by the IUCN.

Distribution
The Northern Iberian chub, Squalius carolitertii (Doadrio, 1988), is a small endemic cyprinid inhabiting the rivers of the Iberian Peninsula across a large area, including the Douro, Mondego, Lima, Minho, and Lérez basins. Recently several researchers have reported this species for the first time from the upper reaches of the Alberche River (a tributary of the Tagus basin in central Spain) and in the Oitavén River (a tributary of the Verdugo River in northwestern Spain).

Diet
S. carolitertii is an omnivorous fish feeding predominantly on aquatic invertebrates, being nymphs of Baetis spp. the most abundant prey, although detritus is an important food item. Moreover, in S. carolitertii, as in many other fish species, there is normally a change in the diet composition during the life of the fish, and these age-related diet shifts occur at three different levels: (1) frequency of occurrence of detritus decreases with fish age; (2) prey selection varies with fish age; and (3) mean prey size increases as fish size increased.

References

[1] Doadrio I. (ed.) 2001. Atlas y libro rojo de los peces continentales de España. Ministerio de Medio Ambiente y Consejo Superior de Investigaciones Científicas, Madrid.

[2] Perea S., Garzón P., González J.L., Almada V.C., Pereira A. & Doadrio I. 2011. New distribution

[3] Sánchez-Hernández J. & Cobo F. 2011. Summer food resource partitioning between four sympatric fish species in Central Spain (River Tormes). Folia Zoologica 60 (3): 189–202.

[4] Sánchez-Hernández J. & Cobo F. 2012. Ontogenetic dietary shifts and food selection of endemic Squalius carolitertii (Actinopterygii: Cypriniformes: Cyprinidae) in River Tormes, Central Spain, in summer. Acta Ichthyologica et Piscatoria 42 (2): 101–111.

Squalius
Endemic fish of the Iberian Peninsula
Fish described in 1988
Taxonomy articles created by Polbot